When Knights Were Bold is a 1908 silent film short directed by Wallace McCutcheon and produced by the Biograph Company. It is based on a very successful 1906 Broadway play(over 500 performances by 1908) written by Harriett Jay(under the alias Charles Marlowe) and starred a young Pauline Frederick, George Irving and veteran comic Francis Wilson. The film survives today and is noteworthy for the appearance of D. W. Griffith in an acting role before he started directing for Biograph.

Cast
Linda Arvidson
D. W. Griffith
Harry Solter - Nobleman

unknown and/or uncredited
Eddie Dillon
May Robson

References

External links
When Knights Were Bold at IMDb.com

1908 films
Films directed by Wallace McCutcheon Sr.
1908 short films